Parting is a 2016 Afghan-Iranian drama film directed by Navid Mahmoudi. It was selected as the Afghan entry for the Best Foreign Language Film at the 89th Academy Awards. However, the film was not included on the final list of submissions published by the Academy. It was screened at the Busan International Film Festival in October 2016. Parting was the inaugural film at the 21st International Film Festival of Kerala.

Cast
 Reza Ahmadi as Nabi
 Fereshteh Hosseini as Pari
 Behrang Alavi
 Nazanin Bayati
 Shams Langroudi

Awards and nominations

See also
 List of submissions to the 89th Academy Awards for Best Foreign Language Film
 List of Afghan submissions for the Academy Award for Best Foreign Language Film

References

External links
 

2016 films
2016 drama films
2010s Persian-language films
Dari-language films
Afghan drama films
Iranian drama films